Majestic Prince is an anime series adapted from the manga series of the same name written by Rando Ayamine and illustrated by Hikaru Niijima. It was broadcast in Japan on Tokyo MX from April 4, 2013, to September 19, 2013. In July 2016 the episodes were rebroadcast, with a new "25th episode" on September 29, 2016, with events leading to a feature film released on November 4, 2016. The anime has been licensed by Sentai Filmworks and was streamed by Crunchyroll and the Anime Network.

The opening theme for episodes 2 through 12 is  performed by Natsumi Kon. The ending theme for episodes 1 to 12 is  performed by Chiaki Ishikawa. Ishikawa also wrote and composed both songs. The opening and ending themes change on episode 13 to "PROMPT", performed by Kon, and  performed by Yōko Hikasa and Yuka Iguchi as their characters Kei Kugimiya and Tamaki Irie, respectively. Episode 6 also features an insert song written by Ishikawa and performed by Kon titled .  by Izuru Hitachi (Hiroki Aiba), Toshikaze Asagi (Shintaro Asanuma), Ataru Suruga (Junya Ikeda) is the third ending, and runs in episode 16 and episodes 20–22. The second ending returns for episodes 13–15, 17-18 and 23.

Episode list

References

Majestic Prince